The principal island on Lough Lene is named after Turgesius who was a Viking leader who is said to have conquered Dublin. 

Geography of County Westmeath